Poropteron graagae, common name the stag shell, is a species of sea snail, a marine gastropod mollusk in the family Muricidae, the murex snails or rock snails.

Description

Distribution
This marine species lives under rocks, 5–10 m. depth, Eastern Cape Province, South Africa.

References

External links
 Kilburn R.N. (1970). Taxonomic notes on South African marine Mollusca, I. Annals of the Cape Provincial Museums. 8(4): 39-48.
 Sowerby, G. B. I; Sowerby, G. B. II. (1832-1841). The conchological illustrations or, Coloured figures of all the hitherto unfigured recent shells. London, privately published.
 Barco, A.; Herbert, G.; Houart, R.; Fassio, G. & Oliverio, M. (2017). A molecular phylogenetic framework for the subfamily Ocenebrinae (Gastropoda, Muricidae). Zoologica Scripta. 46 (3): 322-335

Muricidae
Gastropods described in 1943